Alain Le Ray (3 October 1910 – 4 June 2007) was a French general and Resistance leader.

Le Ray, a keen alpinist, was a lieutenant in the French mountain infantry when wounded and captured by the Germans in June 1940. After a first escape attempt from a prison camp in occupied Poland, he was transferred to Oflag IV-C. In April 1941, he became the first prisoner ever to escape from the Colditz Castle.

Le Ray returned to France, where he held a position in Vichy Army and was posted at the Uriage Leader's School, under Pierre Dunoyer de Segonzac, a pro-Pétain but anti-German officer. Along with Dunoyer de Segonzac, Le Ray chose Resistance in January 1943. He assumed military command of the maquis du Vercors in February 1943. Le Ray left the Vercors in January 1944 and become the Forces Françaises de l'Intérieur local commanding officer. In this position, he freed Grenoble and fought the still German-occupied alpine forts in 1945.

After the war, Le Ray held senior command in Indochina and Algeria and retired in 1970 as a Corps General.

Publications 
 Alain Le Ray, Première à Colditz, Presses Universitaires de Grenoble 2004,

References

French Resistance members
French generals
French mountain climbers
Grand Croix of the Légion d'honneur
Grand Cross of the Ordre national du Mérite
Military personnel from Paris
Commanders Crosses of the Order of Merit of the Federal Republic of Germany
Prisoners of war held at Colditz Castle
1910 births
2007 deaths